Hryhorivsky Estuary, or Small Adzhalyk Estuary, is a brackish water area in South Ukraine, in 30 km to north-east from Odessa. In the lower part of the estuary (left bank) the Port Yuzhny is located. The estuary connected with the sea by the navigation canal 3 km length and 14 m depth.
The length of the estuary is about 12 km, width from 300 m in upper part to 1.3 km in lower part.

References
 Starushenko L.I., Bushuyev S.G. (2001) Prichernomorskiye limany Odeschiny i ih rybohoziaystvennoye znacheniye. Astroprint, Odessa, 151 pp. (in Russian)
 North-western Black Sea: biology and ecology, Eds.: Y.P. Zaitsev, B.G. Aleksandrov, G.G. Minicheva, Naukova Dumka, Kiev, 2006, 701 pp.

See also

 Berezan Estuary
 Tylihul Estuary
 Khadzhibey Estuary
 Dniester Estuary
 Sukhyi Estuary

Estuaries of the Black Sea
Estuaries of Ukraine
Landforms of Odesa Oblast